Zipaetis is a genus of satyrid butterflies.

Species
Listed alphabetically:
Zipaetis saitis Hewitson, 1863 – Tamil catseye
Zipaetis scylax Hewitson, 1863 – dark catseye
Zipaetis unipupillata Lee, 1962

References

Satyrini
Butterfly genera
Taxa named by William Chapman Hewitson